is a Prefectural Natural Park in western Hyōgo Prefecture, Japan. Established in 1958, the park spans the municipalities of Sayō and Shisō. The area is rich in iron sand and there are remains of a large tatara. Designation of the park helps protect the habitat of the Hida salamander, Japanese giant salamander (Special Natural Monument), golden eagle, black bear, and Japanese dormouse.

See also
 National Parks of Japan

References

Parks and gardens in Hyōgo Prefecture
Protected areas established in 1958
1958 establishments in Japan